Machanbaw Township is a township of Putao District in the Kachin State of Burma. The principal town is Machanbaw.

Townships of Kachin State